Paracapnia is a genus of small winter stoneflies in the family Capniidae. There are at least five species described in the genus Paracapnia. They are native to North America.

Species
 Paracapnia angulata Hanson, 1961 (angulate snowfly)
 Paracapnia disala (Jewett, 1962)
 Paracapnia ensicala (Jewett, 1962)
 Paracapnia opis (Newman, 1839) (northeastern snowfly); synonymous with Paracapnia curvata (Hanson, 1946)
 Paracapnia oswegaptera (Jewett, 1965)

References

 DeWalt R, Cao Y, Tweddale T, Grubbs S, Hinz L, Pessino M, Robinson J (2012). "Ohio USA stoneflies (Insecta, Plecoptera): species richness estimation, distribution of functional niche traits, drainage affiliations, and relationships to other states". ZooKeys 178: 1-26.

Further reading

 

Plecoptera